Webview or embedded browser control is a web browser that is embedded in a native app to display web content.

Purposes 

 For app users, web content embedded in an app ensures a seamless experience.
 For app developers, webview offers a simple way of rendering a web page within the app.

List of webviews 

Most major computing platforms, such as Android, iOS, or UWP come with a default webview.

WebView may refer to:

 WebView, an Android framework based on Blink  
 WebView 2, a Microsoft Edge framework based on Blink
 WebView, an older Microsoft Edge framework based on EdgeHTML
 WebView, a legacy Microsoft Internet Explorer framework based on MSHTML
 WebView, an Apple framework based on WebKit
 WebView, the embedded browser component in JavaFX

In-app browsers 

Some apps, for example, social network apps, use in-app browsers to display web content. Often, these come with additional features similar to standard web browsers, for example, the address bar.

Internally, these can use the platform-default webview component, or even their own. As such, they can be seen as an example of webview usage or halfway between webview and a standalone web browser.

Controversies 

Dedicated web browsers usually come with security and privacy features. Users have control over what level of privacy and security they prefer. For embedded browsers, the control is much lower. The privacy risks might be even more critical for in-app browsers which circumvent app store policies to prevent keystroke monitoring and tracking.